Vitaly Sergeyevich Yurchik (born 17 May 1983) is a retired Russian water polo player who played on the  bronze medal squad at the 2004 Summer Olympics.

See also
 List of Olympic medalists in water polo (men)

External links
 

Russian male water polo players
Olympic water polo players of Russia
Water polo players at the 2004 Summer Olympics
Olympic bronze medalists for Russia
Russian expatriate sportspeople in Belarus
Sportspeople from Brest, Belarus
1981 births
Living people
Olympic medalists in water polo
Medalists at the 2004 Summer Olympics